This is a list of gliders/sailplanes of the world, (this reference lists all gliders with references, where available) 
Note: Any aircraft can glide for a short time, but gliders are designed to glide for longer.

Australian miscellaneous constructors 
 Andrews 1930 Glider – Kenneth Edwin Andrews
 Armytage 1929 glider – Norman Armytage
 Barbat-Dunn-Rigby GBDR
 Brookes 1919 glider – Wilfred Brookes
 Brown Two Seater – Vincent Brown & STC-GC (Sydney Technical College Gliding Club)
 Buchanan Ricochet – John Buchanan
 Butterworth-Ypinazar Primary
 Clarkson 1930
 Davies-Nicholls Primary
 Degrandi Dresden – DeGrandi, Howard V.
 Degrandi Slope Soarer – DeGrandi, Howard V.
 Dehn Ringwing – Dehn, Karl
 Free Flight Hornet 130s – Free Flight Aviation Pty. Ltd.
 GCSA Lark – Shackleton, William Stancliffe – GCSA (Gliding Club of South Australia) & BRADLEY, Harold
 Halloran-Wedd Mayfly – Halloran, Clyde & Wedd, William G.
 Handcock 1930 glider – Handcock, William Arthur
 Hinkler 1912 glider - John Louis Hinkler (Bert)
 Iggulden Bluebird – Iggulden, William Palmer & Iggulden, Jack
 Iggulden Tandem 1929
 Iggulden Termagent 3
Lessing glider - Lessing, Kurt 
 Joey (glider)
 Zephyrus – Lyon, Douglas – Beaufort Gliding Club (Victoria, Australia)
 Marsch PG-2 – Marsch, J. C.
 Marsch Seaplane – Marsch, J. C.
 Moyes Tempest – Bob Bailey, produced by Moyes Microlights
 Pascoe EP1 Spruce Goose
 Pelican 2
 Pelton Bat – Pelton, Alfred Paul
 Pelton Bronzewing – Pelton, Alfred Paul
 Pelton ground training machine – Pelton, Alfred Paul
 Pelton Hawk – Pelton, Alfred Paul
 Phoenix (glider)
 Pratt 1929 glider – Pratt, Percival Justin
 Pratt Stunter – Pratt, Percival Justin – AMSCO (Aircraft Manufactory and Supply Company)
 Pratt Two Seater – Pratt, Percival Justin – AMSCO (Aircraft Manufactory and Supply Company)
 Pratt Utility – Pratt, Percival Justin – AMSCO (Aircraft Manufactory and Supply Company)
 Richardson Golden Eagle – Geoff Richardson
 Roberts Primary
 Saint Louis XCG-5
 Saint Louis XCG-6
 Schneider ES-52 Kookaburra two-seat training glider
 Schneider ES-54 Gnome
 Schneider ES-56 Nymph
 Schneider ES-57 Kingfisher
 Schneider ES-59 Arrow
 Schneider ES-60 Boomerang and ES-60B Super Arrow
 Schneider ES-65 Platypus two-seats, side-by-side
 SUE-1
 SUT-1 – (Sydney University Trainer 1) – Sydney University Gliding Club
 SUT-2 – (Sydney University Trainer 2) – Sydney University Gliding Club
 Sylvander Glider - Sylvander, Victor B. (1913); A 27-foot wingspan Chanute-type biplane glider
 Taylor-Moore 1931 – Taylor, Lewis & Moore, Ted
 Thomas Primary 1930 – Thomas, R. R.
 van Dusen amphibious glider
 Warner Brolga – Warner, Martin
 Warner-Campbell Kite 1 – Warner, Martin & Campbell, Allan J.
 Warner Kite 2 – Warner, Martin
 Wikner Golden Sparrow – Wikner, Geoffrey Neville
 Wikner-Lindner Secondary – Wikner, Geoffrey Neville
 Wishart 1930 glider – Wishart, Alfred William

Notes

Further reading

External links

Lists of glider aircraft